Basketball was contested at the 2017 Summer Universiade from August 20 to 29 in Taipei, Taiwan.

Medal summary

Medal table

Medal events

Men

24 teams participated in the men's tournament.

Teams

Pool A

Pool B

Pool C
 United States

Pool D

Women

16 teams participated in the women's tournament.

Teams

Pool A

Pool B

Pool C
 United States

Pool D

References

External links
2017 Summer Universiade – Basketball
Result book – Basketball

 
2017
U
2017 Summer Universiade events